Rajeev Dehejia is a professor of public policy in the Robert F. Wagner Graduate School of Public Service at New York University. He is the author of numerous academic articles in econometrics, labor economics, and development economics, including two widely cited papers on the evaluation of propensity score matching.  He graduated in 1988 from Sir Robert Borden High School and in 1992 from Carleton University with the Governor General's Medal. He completed his Ph.D. in economics from Harvard University in 1997.

References

External links
 http://wagner.nyu.edu/Dehejia
 http://www.nber.org/~rdehejia

1970 births
Living people
Canadian economists
Harvard Graduate School of Arts and Sciences alumni
Carleton University alumni
New York University faculty